Bangrasia is a village in the Bhopal district of Madhya Pradesh, India. It is located in the Huzur tehsil and the Phanda block.

In 2011, the Government of Madhya Pradesh identified this village as the site of a proposed film studio complex.

Demographics 

According to the 2011 census of India, Bangrasia has 1221 households. The effective literacy rate (i.e. the literacy rate of population excluding children aged 6 and below) is 87.58%.

References 

Villages in Huzur tehsil